Heyde is a surname.  Notable people with the surname include:

Chris Heyde (1939–2008), Australian statistician
Erich von der Heyde (1900–1984), German SS official acquitted of war crimes
Gustav von der Heyde (1836–1891), New Zealand politician
Lucina von der Heyde (born 1997), Argentine field hockey player
Maria Heyde (1837–1917), Surinamese-born German missionary, writer and translator
Nikolai van der Heyde (1935–2020), Dutch film director and screenwriter
Werner Heyde (1902—1964), German Nazi psychiatrist involved in Action T4

See also
 Heide (name)
 Heide (disambiguation)
 Heyd